Tommy Baldwin Racing is an American professional stock car racing team that currently competes in the modified ranks. The team is based in Mooresville, North Carolina, and is owned by former crew chief Tommy Baldwin Jr., son of the late modified driver Tom Baldwin.

On October 19, 2016, it was rumored that TBR was selling their charter to Circle Sport – Leavine Family Racing, and possibly shut down after 2016. On Thursday, November 17, 2016, TBR announced that they would stop competing full-time in NASCAR, selling their charter. Despite the news, the team fielded the No. 7 Chevrolet SS for Elliott Sadler, J. J. Yeley, and Hermie Sadler in the Cup Series on a part-time basis, until the team was sold to Premium Motorsports. On November 26, 2018, TBR announced the rebirth of the team for 2019.

NASCAR Cup Series

Car No. 7 history
No. 35 (2010-2011)
In 2010, Baldwin began fielding the number 35 car on a limited basis. Johnny Sauter attempted three races with the car; it did not qualify at California and at Martinsville but made the field at Phoenix. Aric Almirola unsuccessfully attempted Talladega as well.

In 2011, the No. 35 car ran the first Talladega race with former Cup winner Steve Park driving but retired from the race early. Park also attempted one more race in the No. 35, a fan sponsored tribute to modified driver Len Boehler. The Len Boehler tribute was originally planned for the Coke Zero 400 at Daytona but was moved to New Hampshire due to a lack of donations; the team also said that a Northeast track (where the Whelen Modified Tour runs) would be more suitable and had a larger fanbase. The 35 failed to qualify for Loudon. In June, 62-year-old Geoff Bodine was signed to run five races in the No. 35, with sponsorship backing from military health care provider Luke Associates. The scheduled races in the car were at Daytona, Charlotte, Talladega, Texas and Homestead. After having trouble qualifying, Bodine and Luke Associates moved over to the No. 36 team (with a guaranteed starting spot) while Dave Blaney would run the No. 35 in those races. Blaney also attempted the Watkins Glen race in the No. 35 while road course veteran Ron Fellows drove the No. 36. Blaney also ran the September Richmond race in the No. 35 with sponsorship from Pepsi Max, while Stephen Leicht drove the No. 36 in his first NASCAR race since 2009.

David Reutimann (2012)
For 2012, TBR reached an agreement with Stewart-Haas Racing, allowing TBR to field a No. 10 car for rookie Danica Patrick in 10 Sprint Cup races, beginning with the 2012 Daytona 500. For the remaining 26 races, David Reutimann was announced as the primary driver. A number of other drivers also ended up running in the No. 10, including road-course ringer Tomy Drissi at Sonoma, Tony Raines when Reutimann substituted for Kurt Busch at Pocono, and J. J. Yeley. Patrick brought sponsorship from GoDaddy.com, with Reutimann's primary partners being Accell Construction and TMone. For 2013, TBR would keep all rights to the team, including owner's points, however, the No. 10 and GoDaddy would follow Patrick to SHR.

Dave Blaney (2013)

For 2013, TBR changed the car number from No. 10 to No. 7 in honor of team owner Tommy Baldwin's father, who used the number 7NY during his days in NASCAR's Modified division. Heavy-machinery manufacturer SANY America sponsored the No. 7 team in 14 races, while Florida Lottery sponsored both Daytona races and Homestead. Blaney moved from the No. 36 car to run the No. 7 for the majority of the season, while Justin Marks made his Cup Series debut in the No. 7 at Sonoma with sponsorship from GoPro.

Michael Annett (2014)

In 2014, the No. 7 was driven by rookie Michael Annett, bringing his longtime sponsor Pilot Flying J up from the Nationwide Series. Part-time primary sponsors included longtime TBR sponsors Accell Construction for six races, Golden Corral at Loudon and Talladega in the fall, and new sponsor Allstate Peterbuilt. The No. 7 would also utilize an engine-leasing program with ECR Engines. Annett finished 33rd in the 2014 final point standings with a best finish of 16th at Talladega Superspeedway in the spring, with the team also finishing 33rd in final owner points. Annett and Pilot Flying J did not return for 2015, moving to a new second entry at HScott Motorsports.

Alex Bowman (2015)
In 2015, it was announced that Alex Bowman would depart BK Racing in order to join TBR. The team failed to make the Daytona 500 after wrecking in the duel, the first time that any TBR entry had failed to make the Great American Race. Bowman was signed to drive for 2016 but parted ways with the team on January 21.

Regan Smith (2016)

A few hours after Bowman left, Regan Smith joined the team full time driving the No. 7 Chevy, replacing Bowman. Smith had a good start, finishing 8th in the Daytona 500, thus allowing a "Kids Eat Free" campaign to happen the next day, as the car had Golden Corral sponsorship.

Regan Smith, after a dismal season, rebounded at the second Pocono event when he finished 3rd after not pitting during the final 28 laps. It was a season-best finish for both him and Tommy Baldwin Racing, as well as the best finish for the team in the team's history.

Before the race at Homestead–Miami Speedway, Tommy Baldwin announced on Facebook that Tommy Baldwin Racing would shut down their Cup operation after the 2016 season. Their charter was sold to Leavine Family Racing, forcing Smith to qualify on speed. Their last finish was a 38th-place finish at Homestead-Miami Speedway.

Part-time (2017)
Despite the announcement, the team partnered with Elliott Sadler to compete in the 2017 Daytona 500 and the other superspeedways. J. J. Yeley drove the car at the spring Texas race, and at Charlotte in May, Yeley returned to the #7 in the Brickyard 400. It was then announced Hermie Sadler would drive the car at Martinsville. On September 4, 2017, Tommy Baldwin Racing was officially acquired by Premium Motorsports. The team ran other races near the end of the season under the Premium Motorsports banner, with the first being with Justin Marks at Talladega.

Part Time (2020)
On May 11, 2020, Tommy Baldwin Racing announced that Josh Bilicki would be driving the number 7 car at the Real Heroes 400. JJ Yeley, Josh Bilicki and Reed Sorenson both ran 2 races, with Yeley having the team's best finish: 25th at Bristol Motor speedway. After the 2020 season, Baldwin allowed  Spire Motorsports use of the No. 7 for the 2021 season. TBR would not return to the No. 71.

Car No. 7 results

Tony Ave's entry was fielded by TriStar Motorsports.
Danica Patrick's entries were fielded by Stewart-Haas Racing.
Owner Points sold to Leavine Family Racing before the race at Homestead.
Justin Marks, Hermie Sadler and Joey Gase ran under Premium Motorsports banner.

Car No. 36 history
Multiple drivers (2009-2010)
Formerly a Busch Series team, on January 5, 2009, Tommy Baldwin Jr. announced that he would restart TBR as a Sprint Cup Series operation despite the slumping economy and following his release as a crew chief from the defunct Bill Davis Racing team. The team later announced that former Evernham Motorsports and Haas CNC Racing driver Scott Riggs would drive the No. 36, and that Arrington Manufacturing (now Race Engines Plus) would build Toyota engines for the team. Initially made up of volunteers laid off from other organizations, the team qualified for the Daytona 500 and would finish 25th. The team was sponsored by Red Bank Outfitters for the first four races, and would receive short term sponsorship from Array/Nexxus Lighting and Guy Fieri Knuckle Sandwich, though it ran much of the season unsponsored. Riggs would also qualify for the second race of the year but did not qualify for the next three events. After qualifying for eight races in twelve attempts, Riggs announced he would leave the team after Charlotte, when lack of funding forced the team to start and park. Baldwin then signed veteran Mike Skinner to drive for 17 races, Patrick Carpentier for both Pocono races, and Brian Simo for both road course races. Robert Richardson Jr. finished 18th at the November Talladega race with sponsorship from Mahindra Tractors. It was announced in September that Carpentier would run six additional races beginning at Atlanta with sponsor Wave Energy Drink. After failing to qualify for the Atlanta race, Carpentier left the team in due to a business conflict in Canada. Michael McDowell would take over for the remainder of the season.

In 2010, veteran Mike Bliss was hired to drive the No. 36 for TBR with Wave Energy Drink returning to sponsor the team in 14 races. TBR also switched manufacturers from Toyota to Chevrolet in 2010, using Earnhardt-Childress Engines. At Las Vegas in February, the team was sponsored by Kim Kardashian's Sephora perfume. Bliss and Baldwin parted ways in April after the team failed to qualify for two of the first seven races. Johnny Sauter drove at Texas and Talladega. Casey Mears then took over the No. 36 ride and qualified for the Richmond race while failing to qualify at Darlington. Sauter returned to the No. 36 at Dover while Mears went to Team Red Bull as a replacement for Brian Vickers. Geoffrey Bodine made his first race since 2004 when he drove the car at Pocono. Steve Park also made his first Cup start since 2003, finishing 13th in his first Cup Series race at Daytona. It was announced on June 16, 2010, that Mears will return to the No. 36 following his release from Red Bull. Ron Fellows drove the car at the road course race in Watkins Glen, New York. Dave Blaney and J. J. Yeley also ran races in the car.

Dave Blaney (2011-2012)

For 2011, TBR signed Dave Blaney, who Baldwin had worked with at Bill Davis Racing, to drive the No. 36 for the full season. The team planned to attempt every race and complete a minimum of sixteen events (as opposed to starting-and-parking) depending on sponsorship. The team started the season with no primary sponsor and went to Daytona Speedweeks with an unsponsored black Chevrolet, but received 11th hour sponsorship from Golden Corral after the No. 36 made its third consecutive Daytona 500. Blaney led three laps and finished 26th after taking damage from a lap 196 wreck. Oklahoma-based Accell Construction became a 6-race sponsor for the team. All Sport later sponsored the car at Martinsville.  The team suffered misfortune again at the April Talladega race when Blaney nearly spun out while at the front. He salvaged a 27th-place finish after leading 21 laps. Golden Corral later stepped up as a 19-race primary sponsor while All Sport's sister brand Big Red joined the team for 5. The team elected to skip the exhibition race at Charlotte to work on improving the team and preparing for the upcoming points races. Ron Fellows returned to the team at Watkins Glen in August. At the rain-delayed September race in Atlanta, Mike Skinner drove the 36 after Blaney developed a case of kidney stones. Blaney started and parked for Germain Racing's No. 60, while Skinner drove the 36 to a 27th-place finish. At Richmond, Stephen Leicht drove the 36 in his return to Cup. For the final three races of 2011, Blaney moved to the No. 35 and Geoffrey Bodine moved to the No. 36. Following a 13th-place finish at the April 2011 Richmond race with Leicht, the No. 36 moved into the Top 35 for the first time in team history. The team recorded its best finish to date with a third at the October 2011 Talladega race with Dave Blaney, and 2011 marked the first year the team competed in all 36 races.

For 2012, the No. 36 team returned full-time with Blaney behind the wheel, with Ryan Pemberton joining the team as crew chief. The team lost most of its sponsorship from the prior year, with Ollie's Bargain Outlet coming on for four of the first six races. The No. 36 teams owners points were also transferred to the No. 10 car for the season, leaving the team with the 44th-place points from the No. 35 car which would not guarantee a spot in the first five races. The team nearly won the Daytona 500, staying out under caution to gain the lead before the race was red-flagged when Juan Pablo Montoya's car collided with a jet-dryer cleanup vehicle, damaging the racetrack. The race was ultimately restarted, with Blaney scoring a solid 15th-place finish. The team would later sign SealWrap, a partner of Dave and son Ryan Blaney, and Widow Wax for eight races, while Golden Corral would return for the remaining three restrictor plate races. Blaney earned the No. 36 team a spot in the Top 35 after five races. Though the team had to start and park several events, they remained in the top 35 throughout the entirety of the season. Tony Raines and J. J. Yeley would run single races in the car, while Blaney was in the No. 37 car.

J. J. Yeley (2013)

In the 2013 season, TBR originally planned to run as a one-car team with the No. 7 team running full-time. This changed, however, when the team was able to round up enough sponsorship for the No. 36 car to run a full schedule. J. J. Yeley ran the No. 36 car with sponsorship from numerous companies including Golden Corral, United Mining Equipment, Pitt Lite, Accell Construction, and others. Victor Gonzalez Jr. drove the No. 36 at Sonoma and Watkins Glen with sponsorship from IMCA Dominican Republic and Mobil 1. Gonzalez would become the first competitor from the Caribbean region to compete in NASCAR's top division. Yeley finished 32nd in points in 2013 but recorded a tenth-place finish at the Daytona 500, his first top ten since 2008 and his best finish in the race to date.

Reed Sorenson (2014)

For 2014, Yeley was replaced by Reed Sorenson, and veteran crew chief Todd Parrott was brought in to improve the performance of the team. Golden Corral returned once again for the superspeedways with their "Top 10 Kids Eat Free" promotion, with Zing Zang, Flasr, Theme Park Connection, and the Delaware "Click It or Ticket" program sponsoring select races. The highlight of the season was when Sorenson qualified second at the July Daytona race after a rain-abbreviated qualifying session. Due to lack of consistent funding outside of restrictor plate races, the team's performance slumped significantly behind the No. 7 team, forced to use their Pro Motor Engines for multiple consecutive races and skipping practice sessions to save tires and part wear. Perhaps the team's most notable moment in 2014 came at the spring Richmond race. Sorenson blew a tire, which then unwound with the rubber cords striking various components inside the wheel well, causing a small fire. However, the fire would eventually reach the fuel cell causing the car to burst into flames as Sorenson eased it onto pit road, he brought it to a stop, where crew members from Go Fas Racing and Hendrick Motorsports rushed to quickly get Sorenson out of the car. Sorenson was uninjured. Sorenson finished the 2014 season in 34th in the final driver standings, with the best finish of 14th, while the 36 team finished 35th in the owner standings.

After the season, TBR sold the owner's points and equipment of the No. 36 team to Jay Robinson Racing (reorganized as Premium Motorsports) due to lack of sponsorship, and contracted to one full-time team. Because of the move, Reed Sorenson was released, and sponsor Zing Zang retracted their planned five-race sponsorship for 2015 (due to their desire to sponsor Sorenson).

Car No. 36 results

Car No. 37 History
See More: Max Q Motorsports

Note: The 37 was owned by Max Q Motorsports in a partnership with Baldwin’s team until 2014.''

The first appearance of the 37 was in 2014 at Indianapolis Motor Speedway with veteran driver Bobby Labonte behind the wheel. Labonte finished 37th, 4 laps down. Next to be signed to drive the 37 was Dave Blaney, who drove the next weekend at Pocono Raceway and at Michigan International Speedway and Bristol Motor Speedway, the last race that saw Blaney in the field. Blaney posted a best finish of 26th at Pocono. After Blaney retired, Mike Bliss was signed to drive the 37 in 6 events. Bliss was forced to start and park in 4. Unlike Blaney, he did not finish in the top-30 in any of his attempts.

Car No. 71 history 
It was announced that TBR will come back to race in 2019 part-time with the number 71. Their first race was scheduled to be the Daytona 500 with Ryan Truex driving, but he failed to qualify for it. The 71 team has not attempted a race since. After using the No. 7 in 2020, the team announced that they would use No. 71 for the 2021 season after Spire Motorsports requested use of the No. 7. However the team would never make an attempt.

Car No. 71 results

Additional cars

In mid-2012, TBR announced a partnership to provide technical assistance and cars to former driver Larry Gunselman's Max Q Motorsports. Max Q had started the year with Mike Wallace (1 race) and Timmy Hill drivers in a partnership with Rick Ware Racing, but Hill struggled to qualify for races leading Max Q to break off the partnership in April and sending Hill back to RWR in the Nationwide Series. J. J. Yeley was hired by TBR to drive for Max Q. Regular TBR driver Dave Blaney also ran one race for Max Q. Yeley moved to TBR's No. 36 car in 2013, while Max Q shut down.

At the 2013 Sonoma race, with Yeley's usual No. 36 being piloted by Victor Gonzalez Jr. for the weekend, TBR used its partnership to field the No. 37 for him with Gunselman listed as an owner. The team was a late entry, however, with neither Yeley or the No. 37 team receiving points for the race, as the No. 37 car started last and finished 42nd.

In 2014, TBR took full ownership of the No. 37, fielding it as a third team starting at Indianapolis. 2000 Champion Bobby Labonte drove the first race for the team at the Brickyard with longtime TBR supporter Accell Construction. Labonte failed to qualify on speed, using a champion's provisional to make the race. The next week at Pocono, Dave Blaney returned to the team for the first time since entering semi-retirement. The No. 37 also ran with Blaney at Michigan and Bristol. Former TBR driver Mike Bliss drove the No. 37 at Atlanta and Richmond. The team ran a total of ten races with those three drivers, finishing the season 46th in owners points. Their best finish of 26th came at Pocono with Blaney driving. The team shut down following the season.

Car No. 37 results

TBR provided cars and technical assistance to Premium Motorsports, fielding the No. 98 car out of their shop for the Fall 2015 races at Loudon and Homestead with TBR development driver Ryan Preece.

Nationwide Series
TBR made its official debut in 2001 at Charlotte. Ward Burton started 4th and finished 8th in the No. 5 Pillsbury Chevrolet. Burton ran the same car at Homestead-Miami Speedway, qualifying 6th and finishing 7th. The next year the team would switch its number and manufacturer. The team fielded the No. 6 Pepsi Dodge driven by Wally Dallenbach Jr. Dallenbach would start 26th and finish 14th in the team's first race. Dallenbach scored two top tens at Charlotte and Phoenix. Damon Lusk would take over the No. 6 car starting at Richmond but crashed out of the 14th lap. Despite the rocky start, Lusk and TBR would make a run for Rookie of the Year in 2003, with sponsorship from Sta-Rite Pumps. Lusk had a consistent season with only 2 DNFs but would lose out on ROTY to David Stremme and Coy Gibbs.

The following year, Unilever backed TBR, and subsequently announced its Hungry Drivers program. Unilever would select four drivers and run each of them in three Busch Series races. The chosen drivers were Mark McFarland, Tracy Hines, Scott Lynch, and Paul Wolfe. Wolfe was eventually chosen after scoring two top-20 finishes. In 2005, TBR's Busch Series team was bought out by Evernham Motorsports (now Richard Petty Motorsports) and TBR closed up its team.

Car No. 6 results

Car No. 36 history
In 2012, Baldwin announced his return to the Nationwide Series. The team will run the No. 36 Chevrolet in eight races for drivers Ryan Blaney (son of then-TBR Cup Series driver Dave), Ryan Truex, and Bobby Santos III. TBR's first attempt of the 2012 season was at Daytona in February with Truex driving the No. 36. The team picked up a last-minute sponsorship from Grime Boss for the event.  Ryan Blaney then took over driving duties at Richmond in his first of six races with the team. Long-time sponsor of the Blaney family, SealWrap, sponsored all six Ryan Blaney's attempts. TBR once again ran the No. 36 at Daytona in July for Whelen Modified driver and 2010 NWMT series champion Bobby Santos III. Brad Parrott was the crew chief for the team.

For 2013, the car changed numbers to No. 8, absorbing the points from Team SLR. Brad Parrott remained TBR's crew chief. Scott Lagasse Jr. drove at Daytona, Las Vegas, and Richmond. The No. 8 team also ran at New Hampshire with TBR development driver Ryan Preece behind the wheel. The team had sponsorship from East West Marine for the event.

In 2014, the team switched back to No. 36, with Parrott remaining crew chief. Preece again drove the car at New Hampshire with East-West Marine sponsoring. He was also scheduled to drive at Richmond in September, but this was changed to Homestead to avoid conflicting with Preece's Whelen Modified Series schedule.

Car No. 36 results

Partnership with Team SLR
In 2012, TBR created a partnership with Team SLR and driver/owner Scott Lagasse Jr. Team SLR would field the No. 8 Chevrolet Impala in select races during the 2012 Nationwide Season with sponsorship from the Boy Scouts of America and Hybrid Light. Chassis would be provided by TBR, and engines would be provided by ECR Engines.  The team ran 3 races in 2012, with Lagasse driving at Kentucky, Kansas, and Homestead.  In 2013, the team was folded into TBR itself.

Car No. 8 results

References

External links
 
 

2002 establishments in North Carolina
Companies based in North Carolina
NASCAR teams
Companies established in 2002